Helen Darling (born May 1, 1965 in Baton Rouge, Louisiana) is an American country music artist. Darling has released one studio album on Decca Nashville. She also charted one single on the Billboard Hot Country Singles & Tracks chart; "Jenny Come Back," peaked at No. 69 in 1995.

Darling sang background vocals on Garth Brooks' 1994 single "The Red Strokes." Brooks returned the favor by singing background on Darling's album. Two years later, she sang "I Will Always Be With You" for MGM's All Dogs Go to Heaven 2 with Frazier River frontman Danny Frazier in the credits. She also sang "Love Led Us Here" for Disney's Muppet Treasure Island with John Berry in the credits.

As a songwriter, Darling has had her songs recorded by Reba McEntire, Little Big Town and Mindy McCready, among others. She also co-wrote Jo Dee Messina's Number One song "Bring On the Rain."

Helen Darling (1995)

Track listing
"Jenny Come Back" (Tia Sillers, John Tirro) - 3:12
"I Haven't Found It Yet" (Helen Darling, Chuck Jones) - 3:29
"Into the Storm" (Deborah Allen, Billy Burnette, Rafe Van Hoy) - 4:40
"I Love Him, I Think" (Cathy Majeski, Sunny Russ, Stephony Smith) - 3:49
"When the Butterflies Have Flown Away" (Tena Clark, Darling, Gary Prim) - 3:31
"Black and White and Blue" (Tony Arata) - 3:50
"With Every Twist and Turn" (Susan Duffy) - 2:51
"That's How You Know It's Love" (Smith) - 3:51
"Next to Love" (Chuck Cannon, Lari White) - 4:18
"Even God Must Get the Blues" (Dene Anton, John Scott Sherrill) - 3:46

Singles

Music videos

References

External links
[ Helen Darling] at Allmusic

1965 births
American women country singers
American country singer-songwriters
Living people
Decca Records artists
Musicians from Baton Rouge, Louisiana
Singer-songwriters from Louisiana
American mezzo-sopranos
Country musicians from Louisiana
21st-century American women singers
21st-century American singers